Nela Martínez Espinosa (November 24, 1912 – July 30, 2004) was an Ecuadorian communist, political militant, activist, and writer.

Biography

Nela Martinez was born in Cañar, Ecuador and enjoyed writing since her childhood. She joined the Communist Party of Ecuador at a young age, eventually becoming part of its leadership.

On May 28, 1944, she took an active role in the Glorious May Revolution, which toppled the dictatorship of Carlos Arroyo del Río. She orchestrated the takeover of the Government Palace, and for two days she was in charge of the Ecuadorian government, thereby becoming the second female leader in its history (after Marieta de Veintemilla, the niece of Ignacio de Veintimilla). She was never officially named president however. In 1945 she became the first female congresswoman of the National Assembly of Ecuador during the second term of José María Velasco Ibarra.

Martínez married her mentor, fellow communist and celebrated novelist Joaquín Gallegos Lara (1909–1947) of the Guayaquil Group, who had had disabilities since birth. At the age of 21, she told her father: "I intend to marry Joaquín, who is disabled". When her father remarked "Why don’t you become a charity nun?" She had said "I want to fight against injustice, and if nature was unjust with him, then I will fight against nature". Sadly their marriage was brief and ended in divorce. Joaquín Lara left an unfinished novel titled Guandos when he died in 1947; Nela Martinez completed the book and it was published in 1982. Both writers are credited as the authors of Guandos.

Later Martínez had a relationship with Ricardo Paredes, who was regarded as the "Apostle of Ecuadorian Communism", and who in 1926 founded the Socialist Party-Broad Front (which changed its name to the Communist Party of Ecuador in 1931). Martínez and Paredes had a son named Leonardo Paredes Martínez.

In 1951 she married the French revolutionary and antifascist Raymond Mériguet (1910–1988), with whom she remained until his death. They had three children: Juan Cristóbal, Mauricio and Nela Meriguet Martínez

Martínez founded several notable publications, including: the Yucanchi Galpa, the first Quechua-language newspaper in Ecuador, and Nuestra Palabra in the 1960s, the first feminist newspaper in Ecuador.

Martínez had been the director of the Communist Party of Ecuador, founder of the Ecuadorian Female Alliance, and founder of the Revolutionary Union of Women of Ecuador. Together with Dolores Cacuango she founded the Ecuadorian Federation of Indians, which established the first indigenous schools that taught in Quechua.

Martínez was an anti-interventionist, anti-imperialist, and opposed many U.S. government policies. She was a supporter and advocate of the Cuban Revolution and admirer of Fidel Castro until her final days.

Martínez died at the age of 91 in Havana, Cuba in 2004. Her ashes were returned to Quito, Ecuador where they were buried in the El Batán Cemetery, in the presence of her children, grandchildren, and friends.

Family

Nela Martínez's baptismal name was Mariana de Jesús Martínez Espinosa. 
 Her parents were Cesar Martínez Borrero and Enriqueta Espinoza. 
 She was the eighth of thirteen children. Her brothers and sisters were Sofía, Paquita, Aurora, Julio Cesar, Enriqueta, Lola Guillermo, Ricardo, Magdalena, Gerardo  and Estela. Her brother Cornelio died at the age of seventeen, and two other siblings died even younger.
 She had one child with Ricardo Paredes: Leonardo Paredes Martínez
 She had three children with Raymond Mériguet: Juan Cristóbal, Mauricio and Nela Meriguet Martínez.

Selected works
 "El Azote" (circa 1930), poem
 Guandos (1982), unfinished novel by Joaquín Gallegos Lara, completed after his death by Nela Martinez.
 Cuentos de la tortura

References

 Nela Martínez trabajó en la conquista de los derechos de la mujer y del pueblo
 Ecuadorians overthrow dictator (Glorious May Revolution), 1944
 Nela Martínez Espinosa - Diccionario Biográfico Ecuador
 Las cenizas de Nela Martínez arriban hoy a la Capital, Quito, Miércoles 04 de agosto del 2004
 Indigenous Nationalities in Ecuadorian Marxist Thought, Marc Becker, Truman State University, 2008.
 Communism in History and Theory: Asia, Africa, and the Americas, Donald F. Busky, 2002, pg. 216, 217.

External links
 

1912 births
2004 deaths
Ecuadorian communists
Members of the National Congress (Ecuador)
Ecuadorian journalists
Ecuadorian women journalists
People from Cañar Province
Communist women writers
20th-century Ecuadorian women politicians
20th-century Ecuadorian politicians
20th-century Ecuadorian women writers
20th-century Ecuadorian writers
20th-century journalists